Blount Today was a weekly newspaper based in Maryville, Tennessee, covering Blount County, Tennessee.  It was part of the Scripps Interactive Newspapers Group.

The newspaper's first issue was published on 26 August 2004.  On 10 October 2011 publisher Sherri Gardner Howell announced on the web site that the paper would be closing due to financial difficulties and the final issue was published 13 October 2011.  When closed, the paper had six full-time and two part-time employees.

References

External links
Blount Today Website

Defunct newspapers published in Tennessee
Newspapers established in 2004
Publications disestablished in 2011
2011 disestablishments in Tennessee
Blount County, Tennessee
Maryville, Tennessee